Richard Alexander Jamieson (November 13, 1937 – May 2, 2001) was an American football and baseball player and coach of football.  He was the offensive coordinator for the Arizona Cardinals of the National Football League in 1997. He also served as offensive coordinator for the Cardinals in 1985 when the franchise was in St. Louis, Missouri.

Playing career
Jamieson spent three seasons in professional football, 1959 with the NFL's Baltimore Colts and 1960 and 1961 in the American Football League, in which  he was originally the property of the Dallas Texans but was traded to the New York Titans, now the New York Jets.  He also spent two seasons in the  farm system of Major League Baseball's Pittsburgh Pirates after graduating from Bradley University in 1959.  He was a 'Little All-American' as a sophomore in 1956.

Coaching career
Prior to joining the Cardinals staff, Jamieson was the head coach at Indiana State University from 1978 to 1979, leading the Sycamores to a record of 11–11.

Jamieson returned to Peoria and began a coaching career that took him from Peoria High, where his teams were renowned for their offensive prowess, to an assistant coaching position at the University of Missouri. He left there to become head coach at Indiana State, then was hired onto the staff of the NFL's Cardinals, for whom he would serve two stints as offensive coordinator, one in St. Louis and one in Arizona.  Jamieson's career included time as an assistant coach for the NFL's Philadelphia Eagles and the Houston Oilers; he also served in the college ranks for Northwestern University, Rutgers University and Cerritos College.

Personal life
Jamieson's father was Robert Arthur Jamieson, a Scottish emigrant who was a prominent citizen of Peoria, Illinois. His younger brother is Bob Jamieson, a longtime television news correspondent at NBC News and ABC News.

Head coaching record

See also
 List of American Football League players

References

External links
 
 

1937 births
2001 deaths
American football quarterbacks
Arizona Cardinals coaches
Baltimore Colts players
Beaumont Pirates players
Bradley Braves football players
Grand Forks Chiefs players
Houston Oilers coaches
Indiana State Sycamores football coaches
Missouri Tigers football coaches
New York Titans (AFL) players
Northwestern Wildcats football coaches
Philadelphia Eagles coaches
Rutgers Scarlet Knights football coaches
San Angelo Pirates players
St. Louis Cardinals (football) coaches
High school football coaches in Illinois
People from Peoria, Illinois
People from Streator, Illinois
Coaches of American football from Illinois
Players of American football from Illinois
Baseball players from Illinois